The 2021 BWF World Tour Finals (officially known as the HSBC BWF World Tour Finals 2021 for sponsorship reasons) was the final tournament of the 2021 BWF World Tour. It was held from 1 to 5 December 2021 in Bali, Indonesia and had a total prize of $1,500,000.

Tournament 
The 2021 BWF World Tour Finals was the fourth edition of the BWF World Tour Finals and was organized by Badminton Association of Indonesia with sanction from the BWF. This tournament was part of the Indonesia Badminton Festival in which three tournaments; the Indonesia Masters and Indonesia Open, together with this tournament were held at the same venue, played back-to-back. Participation in both tournaments was mandatory to qualify and the performance during the tournaments were counted for this World Tour Finals.

Venue
This tournament was held at the Bali International Convention Center in Nusa Dua, Badung Regency, Bali, Indonesia. It was originally due to be held for the fourth year in a row at the Tianhe Gymnasium in Guangzhou, China, but was relocated.

Point distribution 
Below is the point distribution for each phase of the tournament based on the BWF points system for the BWF World Tour Finals event.

Prize money 
The total prize money for this tournament was US$1,500,000. Distribution of prize money was in accordance with BWF regulations.

Representatives

Eligible players 
Below are the eligible players for World Tour Finals. All gold medalists at the 2020 Summer Olympics were qualified for the tournament, but have to compete in both the Indonesia Masters and Indonesia Open to be eligible. Hence, Chinese women's singles player Chen Yufei and mixed pair Wang Yilyu and Huang Dongping had their qualification withdrawn.

Men's singles

Women's singles

Men's doubles

Women's doubles

Mixed doubles

Representatives by nation 

§: Toma Junior Popov of France play in men's singles and men's doubles, while Lauren Smith of England play in women's and mixed doubles.

Performances by nation

Men's singles

Seeds 

 Viktor Axelsen (champion)
 Lee Zii Jia (semi-finals)
 Srikanth Kidambi (group stage)
 Rasmus Gemke (group stage)

Group A

Group B

Finals

Women's singles

Seeds 

 Pornpawee Chochuwong (semi-finals)
 Akane Yamaguchi (semi-finals)
 P. V. Sindhu (final)
 Busanan Ongbamrungphan (group stage)

Group A

Group B

Finals

Men's doubles

Seeds 

 Marcus Fernaldi Gideon / Kevin Sanjaya Sukamuljo (final)
 Takuro Hoki / Yugo Kobayashi (champions)
 Kim Astrup / Anders Skaarup Rasmussen (group stage)
 Ong Yew Sin / Teo Ee Yi (semi-finals)

Group A

Group B

Finals

Women's doubles

Seeds 

 Jongkolphan Kititharakul / Rawinda Prajongjai (group stage)
 Nami Matsuyama / Chiharu Shida (final)
 Gabriela Stoeva / Stefani Stoeva (semi-finals)
 Kim So-yeong / Kong Hee-yong (champions)

Group A

Group B

Finals

Mixed doubles

Seeds 

 Yuta Watanabe / Arisa Higashino (final)
 Dechapol Puavaranukroh / Sapsiree Taerattanachai (champions)
 Mathias Christiansen / Alexandra Bøje (group stage)
 Marcus Ellis / Lauren Smith (group stage)

Group A

Group B

Finals

References

External links 
 HSBC BWF World Tour Finals website
 Tournament link

BWF World Tour
BWF World Tour Finals
International sports competitions hosted by Indonesia
2021 in Indonesian sport
BWF World Tour Finals
Badminton tournaments in Indonesia